The American sci-fi-comedy television series The Greatest American Hero aired from March 18, 1981, to February 3, 1983, and starred William Katt, Robert Culp, and Connie Sellecca. It consists of 45 episodes in three seasons.

Series overview

Episodes

Season 1 (1981)

Season 2 (1981–82)

Season 3 (1982–83)

U.S. television ratings

Home releases
At present, the following DVD sets of this series have been released.

References

External links
 
 

Lists of American comedy-drama television series episodes
Lists of American fantasy television series episodes
episodes